Ars nova (Latin for new art) refers to a musical style which flourished in the Kingdom of France and its surroundings during the Late Middle Ages. More particularly, it refers to the period between the preparation of the Roman de Fauvel (1310s) and the death of composer Guillaume de Machaut in 1377. The term is sometimes used more generally to refer to all European polyphonic music of the fourteenth century. For instance, the term "Italian " is sometimes used to denote the music of Francesco Landini and his compatriots, although Trecento music is the more common term for the contemporary 14th-century music in Italy. The "ars" in "ars nova" can be read as "technique", or "style". The term was first used in two musical treatises, titled Ars novae musicae (New Technique of Music) (c. 1320) by Johannes de Muris, and a collection of writings (c. 1322) attributed to Philippe de Vitry often simply called "Ars nova" today. Musicologist Johannes Wolf first applied to the term as description of an entire era (as opposed to merely specific persons) in 1904.

The term  is often used in juxtaposition to two other periodic terms, of which the first, refers to the music of the immediately preceding age, usually extending back to take in the period of Notre Dame polyphony (from about 1170 to 1320). Roughly, then,  refers to music of the thirteenth century, and the  that of the fourteenth; many music histories use the terms in this more general sense.

Other musical periods and styles have at various times been called "new art." Johannes Tinctoris used the term to describe Dunstaple; however, in modern historiographical usage, it is restricted entirely to the period described above.

Versus  

Stylistically, the music of the  differed from the preceding era in several ways. Developments in notation allowed notes to be written with greater rhythmic independence, shunning the limitations of the rhythmic modes which prevailed in the thirteenth century; secular music acquired much of the polyphonic sophistication previously found only in sacred music; and new techniques and forms, such as isorhythm and the isorhythmic motet, became prevalent. The overall aesthetic effect of these changes was to create music of greater expressiveness and variety than had been the case in the thirteenth century.

The most famous practitioner of the new musical style was Guillaume de Machaut, who also had a distinguished career as a canon at Reims Cathedral and as a poet. The ars-nova style is evident in his considerable body of motets, lais, virelais, rondeaux and ballades.

This strange but interesting repertory of music, limited in geographical distribution (southern France, Aragon and later Cyprus), and clearly intended for performance by specialists for an audience of connoisseurs, is like an "end note" to the entire Middle Ages.

List of composers

Discography 

 Chants du XIVème siècle. Mora Vocis Ensemble. France: Mandala, 1999. CD recording MAN 4946.
 Denkmäler alter Musik aus dem Codex Reina (14./15. Jh.). Syntagma Musicum (Kees Otten, dir.). Das Alte Werk. [N.p.]: Telefunken, 1979. LP recording 6.42357.
 Domna. Esther Lamandier, voice, harp, and portative organ. Paris: Alienor, 1987. CD recording AL 1019.
 La fontaine amoureuse: Poetry and Music of Guillaume de Machaut. Music for a While, with Tom Klunis, narrator. Berkeley: 1750 Arch Records, 1977. LP recording 1773.
 Guillaume de Machaut. Je, Guillaumes Dessus Nommez. Ensemble Gilles Binchois (Dominique Vellard, dir.). [N.p.]: Cantus, 2003. CD recording 9804.
 Guillaume de Machaut. La Messe de Nostre Dame und Motetten. James Bowman, Tom Sutcliffe, countertenors; Capella Antiqua München (Konrad Ruhland, dir.). Das Alte Werk. Hamburg: Telefunken, 1970. LP recording 6.41125 AS.
 Guillaume de Machaut. La messe de Nostre Dame; Le voir dit. Oxford Camerata (Jeremy Summerly, dir.). Hong Kong: Naxos, 2004. CD recording 8553833.
 Guillaume de Machaut. Messe de Notre Dame. Ensemble Organum (Marcel Pérès, dir.). Arles: Harmonia Mundi, 1997. CD recording 901590.
 Guillaume de Machaut. Messe de Notre Dame; Le lai de la fonteinne; Ma fin est mon commencement. Hilliard Ensemble (Paul Hillier, dir.). London: Hyperion, 1989.
 Guillaume de Machaut. Motets. Hilliard Ensemble. Munich: ECM Records, 2004.
 Philippe De Vitry and the Ars Nova—Motets. Orlando Consort. Wotton-Under-Edge, Glos., England: Amon Ra, 1990. CD recording CD-SAR 49.
 Philippe de Vitry. Motets & Chansons. Sequentia (Benjamin Bagby and Barbara Thornton, dir.) Freiburg: Deutsche Harmonia Mundi, 1991. CD recording 77095-2-RC.
 Roman de Fauvel. Jean Bollery (speaker), Studio der Frühen Musik (Thomas Binkley, dir.). Reflexe: Stationen europäischer Musik. Cologne: EMI, 1972. LP recording 1C 063-30 103.
 Le roman de Fauvel. Anne Azéma (soprano, narration), Dominique Visse (countertenor, narration), Boston Camerata and Ensemble Project Ars Nova (Joel Cohen, dir.). France: Erato, 1995. CD recording 4509-96392-2.
 The Service of Venus and Mars: Music for the Knights of the Garter, 1340–1440. Gothic Voices (Christopher Page, dir.). London: Hyperion, 1987. CD recording CDA 66238.
 The Spirit of England and France I: Music of the Late Middle Ages for Court and Church. Gothic Voices (Christopher Page, dir.). London: Hyperion Records, 1994. CD recording CDA66739.
 The Study of Love: French Songs and Motets of the 14th Century. Gothic Voices (Christopher Page, dir.). London: Hyperion Records, 1992. CD recording CDA66619.

Notes

References 

 Earp, Lawrence (1995). "Ars nova". In Medieval France: An Encyclopedia, edited by William W. Kibler, Grover A. Zinn, Lawrence Earp, and John Bell Henneman, Jr., 72–73. Garland Reference Library of the Humanities 932; Garland Encyclopedias of the Middle Ages 2. New York: Garland Publishers. .
 Schrade, Leo (1956). "Philippe de Vitry: Some New Discoveries". The Musical Quarterly 42, no. 3 (July): 330–54.

Further reading 

 
  (1980). "Ars nova". The New Grove Dictionary of Music and Musicians, edited by Stanley Sadie. 20 vols. London: Macmillan Publishers Ltd.  .
 Fuller, Sarah (1985–86). "A Phantom Treatise of the Fourteenth Century? The Ars Nova". The Journal of Musicology 4, no. 1 (Winter): 23–50.
 Gleason, Harold, and Warren Becker (1986). Music in the Middle Ages and Renaissance. Music Literature Outlines Series 1. Bloomington, Indiana: Frangipani Press.  .
 
 Leech-Wilkinson, Daniel (1990). "Ars Antiqua—Ars Nova—Ars Subtilior". In Antiquity and the Middle Ages: From Ancient Greece to the 15th Century, edited by James McKinnon, 218–40. Man and Music. London: Macmillan Publishers.  (cased);  (pbk).
 
 
 Philippe de Vitry, ARS NOVA (1320) French: http://centrebombe.org/livre/Ars.Nova.html
 Snellings, Dirk (2003). "Ars Nova and Trecento Music in 14th Century Europe" (retrieved on 2008-06-14), translated by Stratton Bull, 12. CD Booklet CAPI 2003.

 
Composition schools
French music history
Walloon culture
French styles of music